XpressMusic was a brand name for a line of Nokia mobile phones that were specially designed for music playback. All of the XpressMusic handsets came with expandable MicroSD memory slots and dedicated music keys, so these phones could also be used as MP3 players. The XpressMusic range was launched in September 2006 to compete with the Walkman brand series from Sony Ericsson. Except for one device, being the Nokia 3250 XpressMusic edition, all XpressMusic models were marketed with the 5000 series prefixes.

In September 2009, Nokia announced the Xseries line of phones. The Xseries replaced the XpressMusic brand.

History

2006-2007 

The original XpressMusic lineup was announced on 27 September 2006, consisting of an all glossy white shell and durable rubberised sides. First models included the rotating candybar Nokia 3250 XpressMusic (a revamped Nokia 3250) and the slider Nokia 5300 XpressMusic. Another slider similar to 5300 was also launched called Nokia 5200, but that model was not marketed as  XpressMusic. These were first released before the end of the 2006.

A few months later for the 2007 year, the Nokia 5700 XpressMusic was added to the lineup, using a twisting function like the 3250.
The ux design for music services  was designed by Justin Small, previously design lead of UK start up Sendo Mobile Phones and later Motorola Mobile EMEUA. Small forecast that the Spotify model would bloom.

2008 
The 2008 lineup saw the first 3G XpressMusic phones, first the 5610 and later the 5320, which included HSDPA. The lineup also added support for MicroSDHC, allowing cards larger than 2GB. The 5610 would be the only XpressMusic phone without a 3.5 mm headphone jack, instead having a 2.5 mm jack.

2009 

The 2009 lineup started with the 5800, one of two new phones (the other being the N97) to use the new touch-based S60 5th Edition, likely designed as a response to the increasing popularity of touchscreen handsets in the market. However, Nokia used the resistive instead of capacitive touchscreen reportedly to appeal to the global market. In this technology, touch is registered when two thin layers of the screen got pushed together under the finger. The 5800 (nicknamed the Tube) also featured a 3.2 megapixel camera with Carl Zeiss technology. Apart from the 5130 and lesser-known 5330, the rest of the lineup are 3G phones running Symbian S60 software, as the Nseries handsets of the time. Despite being a part of the XpressMusic series, the 5800 combined many standard smartphone capabilities too.

See also
Nokia 5200, similar to 5300 but not "XpressMusic" branded
Nokia 5030 XpressRadio, extension of the brand tailored for radio
Nokia N91, music-oriented device from the Nseries
Nokia N81, another music-oriented Nseries device
Nokia Comes With Music
Sony Ericsson Walkman
Motorola ROKR

References